Acroclita vigescens is a moth of the family Tortricidae first described by Edward Meyrick in 1920. It is found in India and Sri Lanka.

Larval host plants are Cordia trifolia and Cordia myxa.

References

Moths of Asia
Moths described in 1920
Eucosmini
Taxa named by Edward Meyrick